Wiesaz is a river of Baden-Württemberg, Germany. It passes through Gomaringen and flows into the Steinlach near Dußlingen.

See also
List of rivers of Baden-Württemberg

References

Rivers of Baden-Württemberg
Rivers of Germany